Pookkalai Parikkatheergal is a 1986 Indian Tamil-language romantic drama film directed by V. Azhagappan. The film stars Suresh and Nadhiya, with Rajeev and Vinu Chakravarthy in supporting roles. The soundtrack was composed by T. Rajendar. The film was released on 29 May 1986.

Plot

Cast 
Suresh
Nadhiya
Vinu Chakravarthy
Rajeev
V. K. Ramasamy
S. S. Chandran
Senthil
Manorama
Ganesh (cameo appearance in song "Pookkala Than")

Production 
The dialogues for the film were written by lyricist Ponniyin Selvan who was credited as Es. N. Ravi. Anuja Reddy was offered to act in the film but declined.

Soundtrack 
The soundtrack was composed by T. Rajendar who also wrote the lyrics. The song "Kadhal Oorvalam" is set to the raga Jog.

Reception 
Jayamanmadhan of Kalki praised the performances of cast, Rajendar's music and Dayalan's cinematography and concluded that the film's director Azhagappan skilfully weaves together tasteful incidents, without slackening till the end. The film was a success, and Rajender won the Cinema Express Award for Best Music Director; while the announcement of the winners for the 7th Cinema Express Awards mentioned his winning was for this film and Mythili Ennai Kaathali, during the presentation only the latter film was mentioned.

References

External links 
 

1980s Tamil-language films
1986 films
1986 romantic drama films
Films directed by V. Azhagappan
Films scored by T. Rajendar
Indian romantic drama films